Bernt Schiele (born November 3, 1968 in Neustadt) is a German computer scientist. He is Max Planck Director at the Max Planck Institute for Informatics and professor at Saarland University. He is known for his work in the field of computer vision and perceptual computing.

Life 
Schiele studied computer science at the University of Karlsruhe and at the École nationale supérieure d'informatique et de mathématiques appliquées de Grenoble (Ensimag). He received his diploma in computer science from Ensimag in 1993 and from the University of Karlsruhe in 1994. In 1994, he was visiting researcher at the Carnegie Mellon University. In 1997, he received his Ph.D. under the supervision of James L. Crowley from Grenoble Institute of Technology (Grenoble INP). From 1999 to 2004 he was assistant professor at ETH Zurich. From 1997 to 2000, he was postdoctoral associate and visiting assistant professor in the group of Alex Pentland at the Massachusetts Institute of Technology (MIT). From 2004 to 2010 he was professor at the department of computer science of the Technische Universität Darmstadt. Since 2010 Schiele has been Max Planck Director at the Max Planck Institute for Informatics and professor at Saarland University.

Awards 

 Fellow of the International Association for Pattern Recognition (IAPR)
 Fellow of the IEEE

Publications 

 P. Dollar, C. Wojek, B. Schiele and P. Perona, "Pedestrian Detection: An Evaluation of the State of the Art," in IEEE Transactions on Pattern Analysis and Machine Intelligence, vol. 34, no. 4, pp. 743–761, April 2012. doi: 10.1109/TPAMI.2011.155
 Leibe, B., Leonardis, A. & Schiele, B. Int J Comput Vis (2008) 77: 259. https://doi.org/10.1007/s11263-007-0095-3

External links 
 Website of Bernt Schiele at the Max Planck Institute for Informatics

References 

Karlsruhe Institute of Technology alumni
Academic staff of Max Planck Society
Academic staff of ETH Zurich
Grenoble Institute of Technology alumni
German computer scientists
1968 births
Living people
Fellow Members of the IEEE
Academic staff of Technische Universität Darmstadt
Academic staff of Saarland University
Max Planck Institute directors